Carol Symes (born 1966) is an American medieval historian at the University of Illinois at Urbana-Champaign. Symes founded the Education Justice Project's Theatre Initiative and directed a full-length production of William Shakespeare's The Tempest at Danville Correctional Center in 2013. She is also the executive editor of the academic journal The Medieval Globe."

Early life
Carol Symes received her advanced education at Yale University from where she received her BA. She earned her M.Litt from the University of Oxford and her Ph.D from Harvard University. She has a Certificate in Stage Combat from the Society of British Fight Directors, which she earned while training at the Bristol Old Vic Theatre School. She is a member of Actors Equity.

Career
Symes is an associate professor at the University of Illinois at Urbana-Champaign.

Symes founded the Education Justice Project's Theatre Initiative and has appeared in Our Play, a medley of scenes by William Shakespeare performed at the Danville Correctional Center in 2012 and in Shakespeare's The Tempest at Danville in 2013 which she also directed.

Selected publications
 History in deed: Medieval society and the law in England, 1100-1600.  Harvard Law Library, Cambridge, Mass., 1993.
 A common stage: Theater and public life in medieval Arras. Cornell University Press, Ithaca, 2007.
 Western civilizations. 17th edition. W.W. Norton & Co., New York, 2011. (And multiple later editions)
Cities, texts and social networks, 400-1500: Experiences and perceptions of medieval urban space. Ashgate, Aldershot, 2010. (With Anne Elisabeth Lester and Caroline Goodson)

References

External links 
Interview with Carol Symes, Director of Our Play, January 2012.

American medievalists
Women medievalists
Living people
Alumni of the University of Oxford
Yale University alumni
Harvard University alumni
Alumni of Bristol Old Vic Theatre School
University of Illinois Urbana-Champaign faculty
American women historians
1966 births
21st-century American women